Ivan Roberts (born 20 May 1973) is a Seychellois swimmer. He competed in two events at the 1992 Summer Olympics.

References

External links
 

1973 births
Living people
Seychellois male swimmers
Olympic swimmers of Seychelles
Swimmers at the 1992 Summer Olympics
Place of birth missing (living people)